Huff Hall is a 4,050-seat multi-purpose arena in Champaign, Illinois, United States. The arena opened in 1925 and was known as Huff Gymnasium until the 1990s. It is named after George Huff, who was the school's athletic director from 1895 to 1935.

Huff Hall is home to the University of Illinois Fighting Illini volleyball and wrestling teams. Prior to the opening of Assembly Hall in 1963, it was home to the basketball team as well.

Currently Huff Hall is used for a variety of sporting events, including men's and women's gymnastics, men's wrestling, and women's volleyball.  At each athletic event banners are hung of past Illini heroes to remind the crowd of the rich tradition that Illini athletics have had.

Every March from 1926 to 1962, Huff Gymnasium played host to the state finals of the Illinois High School Association boys' basketball tournament.

Huff Hall also served as the home of the women's basketball team. Beginning in the 1970s and continuing through the mid-1990s, the team once again used Huff Hall for home games, as it struggled to fill up the Assembly Hall. Since 1997 the team has used the Assembly Hall exclusively, although it struggles with a losing record and to fill up the Assembly Hall.

From 1927 to 2002 Huff Hall was also home to a 25-yard swimming pool which served as the home of the University of Illinois at Urbana–Champaign Underwater Hockey club and the University of Illinois Water Polo Club.  The pool had a consistent depth of 8 ft. which made it ideal for these activities.

In addition to hosting athletic events, Huff Hall is also the home of the College of Applied Health Sciences.

History
Originally called the "New Gymnasium", Huff Hall was designed in the Georgian-Revival Style by Charles A. Platt and university architect James M. White. The building's architecture matches that of the Armory, Main Library, the Union, and other campus buildings. At the conclusion of its $772,000 construction in 1925, Huff Hall replaced the Military Drill Hall (now known as Kenney Gym Annex) as the home for Fighting Illini basketball. The "New Gymnasium" was renamed Huff Gymnasium in 1937 following the longtime athletic director's passing.

Men's basketball records at Huff Hall 

Notes:
*denotes incomplete or partial records.
**denotes played 9 games at Huff Hall but finished season at Assembly Hall.
(N/R) denotes no records

References

Indoor arenas in Illinois
Defunct college basketball venues in the United States
College gymnastics venues in the United States
College volleyball venues in the United States
College wrestling venues in the United States
Gymnastics venues in Illinois
Illinois Fighting Illini men's basketball venues
Illinois Fighting Illini women's basketball venues
Illinois Fighting Illini men's gymnastics venues
Illinois Fighting Illini women's gymnastics venues
Illinois Fighting Illini women's volleyball venues
Illinois Fighting Illini wrestling venues
Swimming venues in Illinois
Volleyball venues in Illinois
Wrestling venues in Illinois
Sports venues in Champaign–Urbana, Illinois
Tourist attractions in Champaign County, Illinois
Buildings and structures of the University of Illinois Urbana-Champaign
1925 establishments in Illinois
Sports venues completed in 1925